The Ecologist group in the Senate is a parliamentary group in the French Senate. Its first formation was from 11 January 2012 to 29 June 2017 that included representatives of Europe Ecology – The Greens (EELV). It was recreated on 29 September 2020.

History 
The number of senators of Europe Ecology – The Greens (EELV) increased from 4 to 10 following the 2011 renewal in which the left took control of the Senate for the first time in the history of the Fifth Republic. Fifteen senators were then required for the formation of a group in the Senate; the threshold was lowered to 10 as a result of an earlier agreement between EELV and the Socialist Party (PS). The ecologist group was officially founded on 11 January 2012 after previously being attached to the socialist group, with Jean-Vincent Placé serving as its first president. After the appointment of Socialists Nicole Bricq and Hélène Conway-Mouret to the government, ecologists Hélène Lipietz and Kalliopi Ango Ela entered the Senate to become the 11th and 12th members of the group. After the rout of the socialists in the 2014 municipal elections, Prime Minister Jean-Marc Ayrault presented the resignation of his government, reducing the ecologist group to 10 deputies once more as Bricq and Conway-Mouret returned to their seats in the Senate.

Placé remained president of the group until his appointment to the government, with Corinne Bouchoux taking his place on 15 February 2016, having previously co-chaired the group from 6 November to 13 December 2015. Placé's departure left the ecologists with only nine deputies, threatening the continued existence of the group; a few days before the deadline, however, Hervé Poher, associated senator of the socialist group, joined the ecologist group, ensuring its survival. Bouchoux concluded her term as president of the group on 3 May 2016, becoming a Secretary of the Bureau of the Senate, and was succeeded in her post by Jean Desessard on 4 May. With André Gattolin joining some 25 senators in forming the La République En Marche group on 27 June, however, the ecologist group once again fell below the requisite number to constitute a group and was dissolved, with Desessard's term as president officially ending on 29 June.

List of presidents

Historical membership

References

External links 
 Lists of senators by political group 
 Historical composition of the Senate and political groups 

Senate (France)
Parliamentary groups in France